Los Bandoleros is a 2009 American direct-to-video short film written and directed by Vin Diesel. It is the second short film in the Fast & Furious franchise and serves as the prequel to Fast & Furious (2009). It stars Diesel, Michelle Rodriguez, Sung Kang, Tego Calderón, and Don Omar. In the film, runaway fugitive Dominic Toretto (Diesel) sets up the hijacking of a fuel tanker in the Dominican Republic.

Development for Los Bandoleros began following the announcement of Fast & Furious, and serves as a narrative bridge following the events of The Fast and the Furious (2001) and 2 Fast 2 Furious (2003). Los Bandoleros was released in the United States on July 28, 2009, as part of the Blu-ray and Special Edition home releases of Fast & Furious.

Plot
Dominic Toretto recruits Han Lue and Rico Santos to help Tego Leo, Dom's associate, escape from a prison in the Dominican Republic. Dom, having lived as a fugitive in the country for the last eight years, and his crew organize a meet with local politician Elvis to set up the hijacking of a fuel tanker; Elvis seeks to exploit the fallout for a political advantage, while Dom and his crew wish to give away the fuel to Rico's aunt, Rabia, and their local community.

Cara and Malo, two of Dom's friends, accompany the rest of the crew to a nightclub to meet Elvis, who arranges the robbery to take place on a highway the following morning. Dom is then surprised by the arrival of Letty Ortiz, who drive together to a beach and rekindle their romance.

Cast

 Vin Diesel as Dominic Toretto, a runaway fugitive hiding in the Dominican Republic who plots to steal oil.
 Michelle Rodriguez as Letty Ortiz, Dom's love interest and an associate in the heist.
 Sung Kang as Han Lue, a criminal associate of Dom who aids him in the oil heist.
 Tego Calderón as Tego Leo, an escaped inmate who works with Dom to steal the oil.
 Don Omar as Rico Santos, a member of Dom's crew and protects him from law enforcement.

The central cast is rounded out by appearances from Juan Fernandez as Elvis, a local politician who helps organize the hijacking. Mirtha Michelle and F. Valentino Morales feature as Cara and Malo respectively, friends of both Dom and Rico. Adria Carrasco also appears as Rubia, Rico's aunt.

References

External links
 
 

2009 action thriller films
American action thriller films
American crime thriller films
2000s Spanish-language films
Universal Pictures short films
Fast & Furious mass media
Films set in the Dominican Republic
Films directed by Vin Diesel
2009 short films
2009 films
Direct-to-video prequel films
One Race Films films
2000s English-language films
2000s American films
American prequel films